Lirab may refer to:
 Lirab, Khuzestan
 Lirab, Basht, Kohgiluyeh and Boyer-Ahmad Province
 Lirab, Kohgiluyeh, Kohgiluyeh and Boyer-Ahmad Province